Kalkie is a suburb of Bundaberg in the Bundaberg Region, Queensland, Australia.

Geography 
Kalkie is bounded to the west by the Burnett River.

History
Kalkie State School opened on 11 February 1878.

A Primitive Methodist church was built at South Kalkie in 1878. Thirty years later it was relocated to Seaview Road, Bargara.

A Primitive Methodist church was built in Kalkie on Sunday 4 August 1878. It  was sold many years later.

St Luke's Anglican School opened in 1994.

Heritage listings 
Kalkie has a number of heritage-listed properties, including:
 257 Bargara Road: Kalkie State School

Education 
Kalkie State School is a government primary (Prep-6) school for boys and girls at Bargara Road. In 2018, the school had an enrolment of 235 students with 22 teachers (19 full-time equivalent) and 20 non-teaching staff (11 full-time equivalent). It includes a special education program.

St Luke's Anglican School is a private primary and secondary (Prep-12) school for boys and girls at 4 Mezger Street. In 2018, the school had an enrolment of 717 students with 58 teachers (56 full-time equivalent) and 42 non-teaching staff (35 full-time equivalent).

There is no government secondary school in Kalkie. The nearest government secondary school is Kepnock State High School in Kepnock to the south.

In popular culture 
Kalkie inspired the iconic Australian song, Sounds of Then (This is Australia), by Gang Gajang.

References

External links 

Suburbs of Bundaberg